The 2021–22 season is the 72nd season in the existence of F.C. Paços de Ferreira and the club's third consecutive season in the top flight of Portuguese football. In addition to the domestic league, Paços de Ferreira will participate in this season's edition of the Taça de Portugal, Taça da Liga, and the Europa Conference League.

Players

First-team squad

Out on loan

Transfers

Pre-season and friendlies

Competitions

Overall record

Primeira Liga

League table

Results summary

Results by round

Matches

Taça de Portugal

Taça da Liga

UEFA Europa Conference League

Third qualifying round
The draw for the third qualifying round was held on 19 July 2021.

Play-off round
The draw for the play-off round was held on 2 August 2021.

References

F.C. Paços de Ferreira seasons
Paços de Ferreira
2021–22 UEFA Europa Conference League participants seasons